An SNL Digital Short''' is one in a series of comedic and often musical video shorts created for NBC's Saturday Night Live. The origin of the Digital Short brand is credited to staff writer Adam McKay, who created content for the show in collaboration with SNL hosts, writers, and cast members. The popularity of these segments exploded following the addition of The Lonely Island (Jorma Taccone, Akiva Schaffer, and Andy Samberg) to the show, and it is to them that credit is given for ushering SNL "into the age of digital online content in a time when it needed to tap into that relevance more than ever."  The Lonely Island's digital shorts were originally recorded with consumer grade digital video cameras and edited on personal computers. It is typical for the show's hosts and musical guests to take part in that week's Digital Short (the latter on rarer occasions), and several shorts have included appearances by celebrities who were not scheduled to appear in any of that episode's live sketches.

The shorts generally took fewer than five days to complete. Schaffer has directed a majority of them, with Taccone as occasional director or co-director. Taccone also has produced music for the shorts as necessary, along with his brother, Asa.

Following the departure of Samberg from SNL in 2012, it was speculated that the era of videos branded "An SNL Digital Short" had come to an end. A total of six new Digital Shorts from The Lonely Island have aired since then: Two that featured the episode's respective hosts (Adam Levine in Season 38 and Natalie Portman in Season 43); two that aired when Samberg hosted the Season 39 finale in 2014; one created for the Saturday Night Live 40th Anniversary Special in February 2015 (featuring Samberg & Adam Sandler); and one that aired during the Season 41 finale in May 2016 to promote The Lonely Island's feature film, Popstar: Never Stop Never Stopping.

List of shorts

2005–2006: Season 31
A total of 11 SNL Digital Shorts were created for the 2005–2006 season.

2006–2007: Season 32
A total of 12 SNL Digital Shorts were created for the 2006–2007 season.

2007–2008: Season 33
A total of 11 SNL Digital Shorts were created for the 2007–2008 season.

2008–2009: Season 34
A total of 17 SNL Digital Shorts were created for the 2008–2009 season.

2009–2010: Season 35
A total of 19 SNL Digital Shorts were created for the 2009–2010 season.

2010–2011: Season 36
A total of 17 SNL Digital Shorts were created for the 2010–2011 season.

{| class="wikitable"
|- style="background:lightgrey;"
! style="width:110px;"|  Title
! style="width:110px;"| Written by
! style="width:110px;"| Directed by
! style="width:110px;"| Original airdate
! Description
|-
| Boogerman| Andy SambergAkiva SchafferJonathon Krisel
| Akiva Schaffer
Jonathon Krisel
| September 26, 2010
| Katy Perry sings at an Academy Awards-like ceremony the theme song from the fictional superhero film Boogerman (played by Peter Sarsgaard).  Features most of the cast including episode host Amy Poehler.
|-
| Rescue Dogs 3D App| Andy SambergAkiva SchafferJonathon Krisel
| Akiva Schaffer
Jonathon Krisel
| October 2, 2010
| A man (Samberg) tries to call 911 to report a home invasion on his iPhone using the app "911 Emergency," but is bombarded with ads for the movie Rescue Dogs 3D.  At the end, Samberg is caught by the burglars, only to be saved by Rescue Dog. Helen Mirren appears as the police chief in the trailer for Rescue Dogs 3D.
|-
| Relaxation Therapy| Andy SambergAkiva SchafferJonathon Krisel
| Akiva Schaffer
Jonathon Krisel
| October 9, 2010
| A man (Samberg) is the subject of a bizarre therapy session conducted by his psychiatrist (played by episode host Jane Lynch) who inserts herself in his self-conscious images of peace and tranquility.
|-
|I Broke My Arm| Andy SambergAkiva SchafferJonathon Krisel
| Akiva Schaffer
| October 23, 2010
| A girl (played by episode host Emma Stone) sings in her school's cafeteria about breaking her arm by slipping on grape jelly.  Her situation only worsens as each verse ends with her falling again, breaking a new appendage until she ends up paralyzed, confined in a wheelchair, and only able to talk through a computer program a la  Stephen Hawking. The grape jelly (Andy Samberg) comes to life and claims not to be the cause of the girl's broken appendages.
|-
|Shy Ronnie 2: Ronnie and Clyde| Andy SambergAkiva Schaffer
| Akiva Schaffer
| October 30, 2010
| Shy Ronnie (Samberg) and Clyde (Rihanna) team up for a second time to rob a bank. Unfortunately, Ronnie's social awkwardness puts the heist in jeopardy and forces Clyde to do most of the work. He raps aggressively when Clyde leaves. Cameo by episode host Jon Hamm as a bank customer-turned-hostage. The ninth track on the Lonely Island's second album, Turtleneck & Chain.
|-
|What Was That?| Andy SambergAkiva SchafferJorma Taccone
| Akiva Schaffer
| November 13, 2010
| Having won a competition, a Model United Nations team present their thoughts on world history to the General Assembly at the U.N. headquarters in New York.  The presentation is a rap (performed by Samberg portraying a student) that chastises the diplomats for past and present atrocities, such as the Holocaust and Darfur.  Musical guest Arcade Fire appear as themselves.
|-
|Party at Mr. Bernard's| Andy Samberg
John Mulaney

John Solomon
| Akiva Schaffer
| December 4, 2010
| A parody of the movie Weekend at Bernie's, in which two men (Hader and Samberg) find the corpse of their boss (played by episode host Robert De Niro) and attempt to make him look alive during a party at his beach house.  They are arrested and put on trial, and proven innocent by Mr. Bernard's video will asking for the exact actions that the two had taken.
|-
|Stumblin
| Andy Samberg
Mike O'Brien

John Solomon
| John Solomon
| December 11, 2010
| A parody of the Dolly Parton song 9 to 5, throughout which Andy Samberg and episode host Paul Rudd stumble throughout the city.  Musical guest Paul McCartney and celebrity chef Mario Batali appear in the short as well.
|-
|I Just Had Sex| Andy SambergAkiva SchafferJorma TacconeJerrod Bettis
Justin Franks
| Akiva Schaffer
| December 18, 2010
| Andy Samberg, Jorma Taccone, and rapper Akon celebrate just having had sex with women (Blake Lively and Jessica Alba respectively), despite the fact that the women found the sex to be mediocre. Lonely Island's Akiva Schaffer shows up at various points during the video congratulating them on having sex, he also mouths the chorus at the end of the song. There is a brief cameo by John McEnroe. The first single off the Lonely Island's second album, Turtleneck and Chain.
|-
| Andy and Pee-Wee's Night Out| Andy Samberg
John Solomon
| Jorma Taccone
John Solomon
| January 15, 2011
| Samberg has some shots with none other than Pee Wee Herman (Paul Reubens). After beating Anderson Cooper (who appears as himself) over the head with a chair, Samberg and Pee-Wee are caught by the police, to which they escape by hitting the officer with a chair. When they return to Samberg's apartment, they come to an intervention with Cooper (bandaged up from being hit in the face with a chair by Pee-Wee and Samberg), Samberg's friends (Fred Armisen, Kristen Wiig, and Kenan Thompson), and Pee Wee's Playhouse friends Chairry, Pterri, and Conky, who plead with Andy and Pee-Wee never to be friends again.  Andy and Pee-Wee reluctantly agree, and everybody celebrates the breakup with more shots.
|-
| The Creep| Andy Samberg Akiva Schaffer Jorma Taccone
Nicki Minaj

Scott Jung
| Akiva Schaffer
| January 29, 2011
| The Lonely Island and Nicki Minaj pose as middle aged stalkers and rap about the latest dance craze (The Creep). John Waters also appears in the short.  The second single from The Lonely Island's second album, Turtleneck & Chain.
|-
|The Roommate|Unknown
|Unknown
|February 5, 2011
|A movie trailer parodying its namesake, in which a college student (Justin Bieber) believes his increasingly bizarre and obsessive roommate (Samberg) is planning to kill him.
|-
| Zach Looks for a New Assistant| Unknown
| John Solomon
| March 12, 2011
| Zach Galifianakis interviews young children as possible candidates for being his assistant.
|-
| Laser Cats 6: The Musical!| Andy Samberg Akiva Schaffer Jorma Taccone
| Akiva Schaffer
Jorma Taccone
| April 2, 2011
| Hader and Samberg again use a celebrity (Tom Hanks) to pitch a new Laser Cats film to Lorne Michaels; this time, a musical version which includes parodies of Cats and Spider-Man: Turn Off the Dark. It is revealed that Hader and Samberg have stolen Wilson the volleyball to blackmail Hanks.  Episode host and musical guest Elton John portrays the villain and Carmelo Anthony plays a security guard.
|-
| Helen Mirren's Magic Bosom| Nasim Pedrad, Sarah Schnedier, one other writer (original sketch);Andy Samberg, Akiva Schaffer, Jorma Taccone (final short)
| Unknown
| April 9, 2011
| Nasim wants to be inspired, so she finds Helen Mirren in her dressing room, where Pedrad dreams she is in "Helen Mirren's Titties", a place beyond space and time, and a sequence of shots involving happy things like two leaders shaking hands, flowers, etc.
|-
| Jack Sparrow| Andy Samberg Akiva Schaffer Jorma Taccone Michael Woods
| Unknown
| May 7, 2011
| A music video for the song of the same name from The Lonely Island's Turtleneck and Chain album featuring Michael Bolton, who writes and performs a "big, sexy hook" for a new hip-hop track that The Lonely Island are recording.  The hook's lyrics reveal Bolton's love for the Pirates of the Caribbean films, as well as Forrest Gump, Erin Brockovich, and Scarface.
|-
| 3-Way (The Golden Rule)| Andy Samberg
Akiva Schaffer

Jorma Taccone

Justin Timberlake
| Akiva Schaffer
Jorma Taccone
| May 21, 2011
| The "Dick in a Box" and "Motherlover" characters (Timberlake and Samberg) return in a song about how any sexual contact between them does not count as a homosexual act, as long as there is also a female (Lady Gaga) involved. Susan Sarandon and Patricia Clarkson have cameos in the opening scene.  Released as a standalone single in 2011 and featured on The Wack Album.
|}

2011–2012: Season 37
A total of 14 SNL Digital Shorts were created for the 2011–2012 season.

2013-present: Additional Shorts
After Andy Samberg's departure, the digital shorts reappeared over the years. Two of them appeared in the Season 39 finale which Samberg hosted.

Dress rehearsal shorts
These shorts were filmed and shown to the studio audience during the weekly SNL dress rehearsal, but were not included in the live show and have yet to appear on air.

 Other Lonely Island shorts on SNL 
Produced by The Lonely Island, and/or labeled Digital Shorts on official YouTube postings, these shorts aired on an SNL episode but not with the official "An SNL Digital Short" title card.  As with the Digital Shorts, these are directed by Akiva Schaffer.  However, according to The Lonely Island's official website, the majority of the MacGruber shorts are directed by Jorma Taccone.

 Reception 
The short "Lazy Sunday", which aired on December 17, 2005, was viewed more than five million times on YouTube alone before it was removed due to copyright infringement.  In late 2006, however, NBC began uploading SNL shorts on YouTube themselves.  As of September 25, 2019, the upload currently available on the show's YouTube channel has received over two million views.

The short "Dick in a Box", which aired on December 16, 2006, was viewed more than 28 million times on YouTube.  The uncensored version was available on YouTube with a special warning, stating that the sketch contained explicit language that was censored from the television version. The song also won a Creative Arts Emmy Award in 2007 for Outstanding Original Music and Lyrics.  Songs from five other Digital Shorts received Emmy nominations for Outstanding Original Music and Lyrics: "Motherlover" in 2009; "Shy Ronnie" in 2010; and "I Just Had Sex", "Jack Sparrow", and "3-Way (The Golden Rule)" in 2011.

The ShootingThe Shooting, also known as Dear Sister, was broadcast during an episode aired April 14, 2007. The short satirizes the final scene of The O.C.s second-season finale."SNL Digital Short inspired by the O.C. " The Lonely Island had the idea for the short before even being hired by Saturday Night Live and had previously recorded their own version of the short. The NBC network, which usually uploads Saturday Night Live digital shorts to its official site and YouTube channel immediately following broadcast, did not do so for Dear Sister due to music clearance issues. It nevertheless became immensely popular on YouTube with artists making parodies, re-enactments and other references.

Plot
Keith (Bill Hader) writes a letter to his sister, as Dave (Andy Samberg) asks what he is doing. As Keith responds, explaining he has not seen his sister in a long time, Dave suddenly and inexplicably shoots him. In the following overly dramatic, slow-motion death overdubbed by a cue of "Hide and Seek" by Imogen Heap, Dave is seen visibly shaken as Keith, in shock, collapses. As Dave gathers his bearings, Keith suddenly shoots him, having recovered from his injury long enough to exact his revenge to the same music cue.

Another man, Eric (Shia LaBeouf), enters looking for them. Dave comes back to life to shoot Eric in the stomach; he collapses, once again to the same music. The sister herself (Kristen Wiig) enters the scene, and begins to read the letter, until she too is shot several times by each of the three men on the ground, with the music cue restarting with every shot.

The short ends with two police officers (Jason Sudeikis and Fred Armisen) observing the crime scene. One (Armisen) finds the letter, left on the table near the brother's body, and begins to read. The letter is revealed to be a prediction of each shooting, in detail, and ends claiming that two police officers will come across the letter and then shoot each other after reading it. While the reading officer laughs it off, his partner turns and shoots him, as the reading officer shoots his partner as well, to overlapping "Hide and Seek" cues.

Controversy
On April 16, 2007, two days following the initial air date of the sketch, the Virginia Tech shooting occurred and became the deadliest school shooting in modern U.S. history at the time. Noam Cohen of The New York Times'' criticized fans of the short for insensitivity when they continued to make YouTube videos based on it.

External links
 "Dear Sister" video on The Lonely Island website
 Dear Sister YouTube video

References

Saturday Night Live sketches
Saturday Night Live in the 2000s
2005 web series debuts
Saturday Night Live in the 2010s